Alexander Milne (1742–1838) was a Scottish American entrepreneur and philanthropist and was born in Fochabers, Moray, Scotland.  He was employed as a footman by the Duke of Richmond and Gordon and when ordered by the duke to powder his red hair, Milne declined, left his employment and emigrated to the American colonies.  By 1776, Milne had moved to New Orleans in Louisiana (New Spain), where, after doing well in the hardware business, he set up a brick-making company using mainly slave labour—by the late 18th century most of the brick used in New Orleans was made at his works.

Appearance
Milne was said to be small in stature with a drooping head and his eyes continuously focused on the ground and apparently heedless of things going on around him. Although his dress was shabby causing him on occasion to be mistaken for a beggar he was well regarded by those who knew him.

Real estate investments
The Spanish Government granted Milne large tracts of swamp lands bordering on Lake Pontchartrain and seeing the potential for development continued to invest heavily in the area right up until his death.  He owned large quantities of land in his own establishment town of Milneburg (now a section of New Orleans) and according to Kendall, in the course of one week disposed of some of his landholdings realising $3,000,000.  He continued to invest in property in New Orleans and at his death, his real estate properties were worth more than $2,000,000.

Death and bequests
Milne died in October 1838 and was buried in Saint Louis No. 2 Cemetery, New Orleans having made his will only three years earlier.  In the will he bequeathed $30,000 to his relatives in his home town of Fochabers, Scotland; he freed his two house servants, gave them land on Esplanade Avenue and ensured that $10,000 would be provided to build two brick houses for them and until such time as the houses were built his executors would pay them $3 per day to support them.  The remainder of the will was sectioned into five parts; $100,000 was provided for the founding of a free school for the boys and girls in Fochabers and surrounding area; to the other four his will stated the following:

Dispute regarding legality of Fochabers bequest
Louisiana state law prohibited foreign legatees from being able to inherit if the laws of the country in which the legatee resided prevented a citizen of Louisiana from receiving a similar inheritance. Scots Law allowed only British citizens to inherit a legacy.  Lengthy litigation was brought by the Duke of Richmond and Gordon on behalf of the town of Fochabers. Louisiana courts twice ruled that the legacy could not be granted but eventually on appeal to the Supreme Court of Louisiana, the bequest was finally allowed.

See also
 Milne's High School
 Milneburg

References

Sources

External links

1742 births
1838 deaths
Businesspeople from New Orleans
People from Moray
Scottish businesspeople
British emigrants to the United States
American philanthropists
Scottish philanthropists